(written as Roc 'N Rope on the American flyer and in Konami Arcade Classics) is a platform game developed by Konami and released in arcades in 1983 by Konami, Kosuka, and Interlogic. It was designed by Tokuro Fujiwara. The player controls a flashlight and harpoon-gun equipped archaeologist who must ascend a series of rocky platforms to reach a phoenix bird.

Coleco released versions of Roc'n Rope for the Atari 2600 and ColecoVision in 1984.

Gameplay
The player has to avoid ferocious man-sized dinosaurs and red-haired cavemen against which there are no direct means of offense. The only ways to defeat the opponents are to either daze them with the flashlight, or wait for them to be suspended on a harpoon rope and cause them fall down, an element which adds a certain complexity to the game. Bonus items to collect include fallen phoenix feathers and phoenix eggs, which grant the player invulnerability from the prehistoric denizens for a short period of time.

Reception
Roc'n Rope was among Konami's early arcade hits,  including Scramble (1981), Frogger (1981), and Yie Ar Kung-Fu (1984).

Legacy
Roc'n Rope was the first "wire action" game. It became the basis for Capcom's 1987 game Bionic Commando, which Tokuro Fujiwara intended to be an expanded version of Roc'n Rope.

Notes

References

External links

1983 video games
Konami games
Arcade video games
Atari 2600 games
ColecoVision games
Platform games
Konami arcade games
Video games developed in Japan